The Mongols is a 1961 Italian/French international co-production historical adventure film directed by Andre DeToth and Leopoldo Savona, and starring Jack Palance and Anita Ekberg.

Plot

Cast
 Jack Palance as Ogatai
 Anita Ekberg as Hulina
 Antonella Lualdi as Amina
 Franco Silva as Stepen of Crakow
 Gianni Garko as Henry de Valois
 Roldano Lupi as Genghis Khan
 Gabriella Pallotta as Lutezia
 Gabriele Antonini as Temugin
 Pierre Cressoy as Igor
 Mario Colli as Boris

External links
 
 
 I mongoli at Variety Distribution
 
 

1960 films
1960s historical adventure films
French historical adventure films
Italian historical adventure films
Peplum films
1960s Italian-language films
English-language French films
English-language Italian films
1960s English-language films
Films directed by Andre DeToth
Films scored by Mario Nascimbene
Films set in the 13th century
Depictions of Genghis Khan on film
Films shot in Italy
Sword and sandal films
1960s multilingual films
French multilingual films
Italian multilingual films
1960s Italian films
1960s French films